Sandnes is a city and municipality in Rogaland, Norway. It lies immediately south of Stavanger, the 4th largest city in Norway and together, the Stavanger/Sandnes area is the third-largest urban area in Norway. The urban city of Sandnes lies in the extreme western part of the vast municipality and it makes up about 5% of the total land area of the municipality.

Sandnes is part of the traditional district of Jæren. The western part of the municipality is very urbanized while the eastern part of the municipality is very rural. The municipality is divided into 13 boroughs and the administrative centre is located in the borough of Trones og Sentrum, a borough in the city. There are several villages in the rural parts of the municipality including Hommersåk, Høle, Foss-Eikeland, Stokka, Forsand, Lysebotn, and Vatne.

The  municipality is the 109th largest by area out of the 356 municipalities in Norway. Sandnes is the 7th most populous municipality in Norway with a population of 80,704 in Q1 2021.

History

The small port village of Sandnes was granted ladested (small seaport city) status in 1860. On 6 April 1861, the small city was separated from the municipality of Høyland to form a separate self-governing municipality of its own. Initially, the municipality had 440 residents. On 1 July 1957, a small part of Høyland municipality (population: 18) was transferred to the city of Sandnes.

During the 1960s, there were many municipal mergers across Norway due to the work of the Schei Committee. On 1 January 1965, the city and municipality of Sandnes (population: 3,961) was merged with the municipality of Høyland (population: 20,353) and parts of the municipalities of Høle (population: 926) and Hetland (population: 2,077).

In 2014, the Storting decided that the number of municipalities in Norway would be lowered. If the municipalities of Sandnes, Stavanger and Sola were to merge, a new municipality would be formed called Nord-Jæren, after the name of the geographical location the municipalities are located in. After the city council said no to the merge, proposals for Forsand to merge with Sandnes were enacted instead.

On 1 January 2017, a small  area on the southwestern edge of the village of Solakrossen was transferred from Sandnes municipality to the neighboring municipality of Sola.

On 1 January 2020, most of the neighboring municipality of Forsand was merged with Sandnes to form one large municipality called Sandnes.

Name
The municipality (and city) is named after an old  farm, since the city was built on its grounds. The farm was located at the end of the Gandsfjorden where the city centre is located today.

Coat of arms

The coat of arms was granted on 21 April 1972. The arms show a white piece of pottery on a green background. Pottery was chosen since it was one of the main industries in the late 18th century. The ceramic Sandnes cuckoo is an ocarina or simple flute which was made by the potteries in Sandnes and used to advertise their products. Later it also became a nickname for people from Sandnes.

Geography
The municipality lies in the Jæren region and stretches  nearly from the west coast of Norway to the rugged mountainous interior. The municipality of Sola is located to the west, Klepp and Time, Gjesdal to the south, Sirdal and Bykle to the east, Strand and Hjelmeland to the northeast, and Stavanger to the northwest. The fjord Gandsfjorden is situated north–south at the west end of the municipality and the Høgsfjorden and Lysefjorden dominate the eastern part of the municipality. The international airport for Sandnes/Stavanger is situated in Sola, just to the west of Sandnes.

Prior to 2020 (when the municipality was enlarged), the city-municipality of Sandnes was divided into 13 boroughs: Austrått, Figgjo, Ganddal, Hana, Høle, Lura, Malmheim og Soma, Riska, Sandved, Stangeland, Sviland, and Trones og Sentrum.

The landscape of western Sandnes is quite flat. From Stavanger and Sandnes it is approximately one hour by car to alpine and skiing resorts. In Sandnes there are some easily accessible small mountain peaks, such as Dalsnuten and Lifjell, with a view over the Sandnes/Stavanger area. The renowned Lysefjorden is also easily accessible by car or boat. The lake Frøylandsvatnet, the river Figgjoelva, and the mountain Hanafjellet are all located in Sandnes.

The famous Kjeragbolten boulder and Kjeragfossen waterfall are located along the inner part of the fjord. The village of Lysebotn lies at the eastern end of the fjord. The lake Nilsebuvatnet is located high up in the mountains, north of Lysebotn on the border of Strand and Forsand municipalities. It is regulated for hydroelectric power use at the Lysebotn Hydroelectric Power Station.

Location
Sandnes is located on the west coast of Norway. Here are some distances from the city of Sandnes to other major cities in Norway:

Government
All municipalities in Norway, including Sandnes, are responsible for primary education (through 10th grade), outpatient health services, senior citizen services, unemployment and other social services, zoning, economic development, and municipal roads. The municipality is governed by a municipal council of elected representatives, which in turn elect a mayor. The municipality falls under the Jæren District Court and the Gulating Court of Appeal.

Municipal council
The municipal council of Sandnes is made up of 49 representatives that are elected to four-year terms. Elections are always held two years from the parliamentary elections.

Media gallery

Economy

Sandnes hosts a large array of retail shops of most kinds and is used by the neighbouring municipalities appreciating the service and wide range of selections. Sandnes is known as Norway's bicycle city, mainly due to the fact that the bicycle manufacturer Øglænd DBS was situated here for decades. The city offers a variety of routes for everyday riders and tourists. Since 1996, a public bicycle rental program has been in operation in the city.

The city has a vibrant industrial base, mainly in the Ganddal area in the south and the Lura and Forus area in the north along the municipal boundary with Stavanger. There is significant activity related to oil exploration in the North Sea and also some IT-related companies. In this suburban region between Sandnes and Stavanger, malls and department stores have also been established. Among these malls is one of Norway's biggest malls, Kvadrat, meaning 'square' (although it is not square shaped anymore as it has expanded several times since it opened in 1984).

Around 30% of the population is employed in Stavanger (Q4 2004). Sandnes was formerly known as the pottery town of Norway – due to the important ceramics industry based on the extensive occurrence of clay in the surroundings. The Vatneleiren military base is also located in Sandnes, just outside Vatne.

Culture, sports, and education
Since 2016, the primary football team, Sandnes Ulf, has played in the second tier, 1. divisjon, of Norwegian professional football.

Sandnes is also known for its Rugby League team, Sandnes Raiders which has supplied the Norwegian national team with players.

The major tourist attraction in Sandnes is the Science Factory (Vitenfabrikken). It is a  science museum with science and art exhibitions, a planetarium, sun telescopes, and chemistry experiments.

Sandnes is the only city in Norway which is a member of the World Health Organization's network of Healthy Cities. Sandnes and Stavanger were chosen along with Liverpool, United Kingdom, to be a European Capital of Culture for 2008.

Higher education facilities include Sandnes Upper Secondary School, Gand Upper Secondary School, Akademiet Upper Secondary School, and Vågen Upper Secondary School. In 2010 Forus Upper Secondary School and parts of Lundehaugen merged to become Vågen. Lundehaugen still exists as a middle school.

The city is also home to the VID Specialized University Sandnes campus, a private christian college.

Churches

The Church of Norway has nine parishes within the municipality of Sandnes. It is part of the Sandnes prosti (deanery) in the Diocese of Stavanger. The main church for the city is Sandnes Church, which is the seat of the deanery which covers the whole municipality.

Notable residents

 Karen Grude Koht (1871 in Høyland – 1960) educationalist, essayist and feminist pioneer
 Theodor Thjøtta (1885 in Sandnes – 1955) physician, dealt with bacteriology and serology
 Elise Ottesen-Jensen (1886 in Hoyland − 1973) sex educator, journalist and anarchist
 Aaslaug Aasland (1890 in Sandnes – 1962) politician, Minister of Social Affairs, 1948 to 1953
 Toralv Øksnevad (1891 in Høyland – 1975) politician, journalist, newspaper editor and radio personality - the "voice from London" during WWII
 Sigrid Stray (1893 in Sandnes – 1978) barrister and proponent of women's rights
 Soffi Schønning (1895–1994) operatic soprano, lived in Sandnes in later life
 Kasper Idland MM, (1918 in Figgjo – 1968) Norwegian heavy water saboteur in 1943
 Kåre Berven Fjeldsaa (1918 in Sandnes – 1991) ceramic designer, early user of stoneware
 Tormod Førland (1920 in Høyland – 1995) chemist, worked on inorganic and physical chemistry
 Arne Sandnes (1925-2006) politician, mayor of Sandnes in the 1970s
 Roald G. Bergsaker (born 1942) sports official and politician, mayor of Sandnes, 1986 to 1990 and Rogaland county mayor, 1999 to 2007
 Julie Ege (1943 in Sandnes – 2008) actress and model 
 Ivar Braut (born 1956 in Sandnes) a theologian and priest, the Bishop of Stavanger, 2017-2019
 Roger Rasmussen (born ca.1965 in Sandnes) stage name Nattefrost, vocalist and founder of Carpathian Forest, a black metal band
 Mette Grøtteland (born 1969 in Sandnes) first female fighter pilot, Royal Norwegian Air Force 
 Kjartan Salvesen (born 1976 in Sandnes) winner of Norwegian Idol TV series in 2004
 Thomas Dybdahl (born 1979 in Sandnes) singer-songwriter
 Anh Vu (born 1986 in Sandnes) singer and actress 
 Annette Obrestad (born 1988) professional poker player; won the 2007 World Series of Poker Europe aged 18; lives in Sandnes

Sport 
 Bjarne Berntsen (born 1956 in Sandnes) a former football player with 33 caps with Norway and coach with Norway women (2005–2009), Viking FK, and Sandnes Ulf
 Anne Brit Skjæveland (born 1962) retired heptathlete, lives in Sandnes
 Linda Medalen (born 1965 in Sandnes) former footballer, 152 caps with Norway women
 Gjert Ingebrigtsen (born 1966) sports coach, father and coach of sons Henrik, Filip and Jakob; lives in Sandnes
 Rolf Bae (1975 in Sandnes – 2008) Arctic adventurer and mountaineer
 Arild Haugen (born 1985) former strongman, currently a professional boxer; lives in Sandnes
 Stine Borgli (born 1990 in Sandnes) racing cyclist
 1500-metre runner brothers:
Henrik Ingebrigtsen (born 1991 in Sandnes), competed at the 2012 and 2016 Summer Olympics
Filip Ingebrigtsen (born 1993 in Sandnes), competed at the European and World Athletics Championships
Jakob Ingebrigtsen (born 2000 in Sandnes), two gold medals at the 2018 European Athletics Championships, Olympic champion over 1500 meters in Tokyo 2020.

References

External links

 
 
Municipal fact sheet from Statistics Norway 
 Municipality website  
 Region Stavanger & Ryfylke toursist website
 Website about the city

 
Municipalities of Rogaland
1861 establishments in Norway
Jæren